Sangota is a village in Swat District of Khyber-Pakhtunkhwa. It is located at 34°47'0N 72°25'0E with an altitude of 1120 metres (3677 feet). Catholic Public High School is located in the village. The Mayor of Sangota is Malak Sadiq Ahmad whose great-grandfather was the Mayor and Chief of Sangota since 1877

References

Populated places in Swat District
Swat District